Ana Reed (born Ana Marinovic, 1980 in Geelong, Australia) is CEO of Newmanity and former Croatian professional women's basketball player and businesswoman. She played the power forward position for women-division clubs in Croatia and Australia.

Professional career

Newmanity 
In 2020, she became the Founder of Newmanity, a leadership consultancy. The company offers psychologists, artists, entrepreneurs and practitioners to help make companies become more human-centric.

Women of Inspiration 
In 2017, she was the host of the first Women of Inspiration event in Maui. Attendees included female global CEOs and celebrities from the UK, Silicon Valley and China including Maggie Cheng, Secretary General of the China Entrepreneur Club.

Basketball career 
A centre and power forward player, Marinovic played a season for Zadar in the Croatian A1 women's league and 5 seasons in the Big V women's league in Australia.  In 2010, Marinovic was selected in the Big V All Star 5.  In 2002, 2003, she was selected for the Australian University Team 

Marinovic  was President & Founder of Love Guinea Basketball. The program was given an official mandate by the Government of Guinea in July 2013 to stabilize the effect on in-country violence, and enhance opportunities for economic and social prosperity. The program helped the Guinea Women’s basketball team progress within the FIBA ranks.

References

External links 
 Eurobasket profile
 SportsTG profile

1980 births
Sportspeople from Geelong
Australian women's basketball players
Living people
Croatian women's basketball players
Power forwards (basketball)